The Rwenzori apalis or collared apalis (Oreolais ruwenzorii) is a species of bird in the family Cisticolidae. 
It is found in Burundi, Democratic Republic of the Congo, Rwanda, and Uganda. Its natural habitat is subtropical or tropical moist montane forest.

The Rwenzori apalis was formerly placed in the genus Apalis but was moved to the new genus Oreolais when Apalis was shown to be polyphyletic.

References

Rwenzori apalis
Birds of Central Africa
Rwenzori apalis
Taxonomy articles created by Polbot